Jaakko Asikainen (26 January 1941 – 4 November 2017) was a Finnish sports shooter. He competed in the 50 metre rifle, prone event at the 1972 Summer Olympics.

References

External links
 

1941 births
2017 deaths
Finnish male sport shooters
Olympic shooters of Finland
Shooters at the 1972 Summer Olympics
Sportspeople from Uusimaa